The CSA Awards are a set of annual cricket awards given by the Cricket South Africa (CSA). The awards recognise and honour the best South African international and domestic cricketers of the past season.

List of winners

2010
The winners were awarded on 20 July 2010.

International
 Cricketer of the year: Hashim Amla
 Test cricketer of the year: Hashim Amla
 ODI cricketer of the year: AB de Villiers
 T20I cricketer of the year: Charl Langeveldt
 Players' player of the year: Hashim Amla
 Fans' player of the year: Hashim Amla
 International newcomer of the year: Ryan McLaren

Domestic
 First-class cricketer of the season: Rilee Rossouw
 One-day Cup cricketer of the season: Herschelle Gibbs
 Twenty20 cricketer of the season: Colin Ingram
 Domestic players' player of the season: Colin Ingram
 SACA MVP: Colin Ingram

2011
The winners were awarded on 7 June 2011.

International
 Cricketer of the year: Jacques Kallis
 Test cricketer of the year: Jacques Kallis
 ODI cricketer of the year: AB de Villiers
 T20I cricketer of the year: Lonwabo Tsotsobe
 Players' player of the year: Hashim Amla
 Fans' player of the year: Hashim Amla
 International newcomer of the year: Imran Tahir

Domestic
 First-class cricketer of the season: Imran Tahir
 One-day Cup cricketer of the season: Faf du Plessis
 Twenty20 cricketer of the season: Owais Shah
 Domestic players' player of the season: Imran Tahir
 Domestic newcomer of the season: Yaseen Vallie
 Coach of the year: Richard Pybus
 CSA Fair Play award: Warriors
 SACA MVP: Morne van Wyk
 Umpire of the year: Johan Cloete
 Umpires' umpire of the year: Johan Cloete
 Groundsman of the year: Louis Kruger
 Scorers' Association of the year: Gauteng Cricket Board

2012
The winners were awarded on 6 June 2012.

International
 Cricketer of the year: Vernon Philander
 Test cricketer of the year: Vernon Philander
 ODI cricketer of the year: AB de Villiers
 T20I cricketer of the year: Richard Levi
 Players' player of the year: AB de Villiers
 Fans' player of the year: Vernon Philander
 International newcomer of the year: Marchant de Lange
 Women's cricketer of the year: Shandre Fritz

Domestic
 First-class cricketer of the season: Alviro Petersen
 One-day Cup cricketer of the season: Dean Elgar
 Twenty20 cricketer of the season: Farhaan Behardien
 Domestic players' player of the season: Faf du Plessis
 Domestic newcomer of the season: Eddie Leie
 Coach of the year: Matthew Maynard
 CSA Fair Play award: Dolphins
 SACA MVP: Morne van Wyk
 Under-19 cricketer of the year: Quinton de Kock

2013
The winners were awarded on 9 September 2013.

International
 Cricketer of the year: Hashim Amla
 Test cricketer of the year: Hashim Amla
 ODI cricketer of the year: AB de Villiers
 T20I cricketer of the year: Dale Steyn
 Players' player of the year: AB de Villiers
 Fans' player of the year: Hashim Amla
 Delivery of the year: Jacques Kallis
 International newcomer of the year: Kyle Abbott
 Women's cricketer of the year: Marizanne Kapp

Domestic
 First-class cricketer of the season: Johann Louw
 One-day Cup cricketer of the season: Richard Levi
 Twenty20 cricketer of the season: Quinton de Kock
 Domestic players' player of the season: Kyle Abbott
 Domestic newcomer of the season: Ayabulela Gqamane
 Coach of the year: Geoffrey Toyana
 CSA Fair Play award: Lions
 SACA MVP: Roelof van der Merwe
 Umpire of the year: Johan Cloete
 Umpires' umpire of the year: Shaun George
 Groundsman of the year: Chris Scott
 Scorers' Association of the year: Gauteng Cricket Board

2014
The winners were awarded on 3 June 2014.

International
 Cricketer of the year: AB de Villiers
 Test cricketer of the year: AB de Villiers
 ODI cricketer of the year: Quinton de Kock
 T20I cricketer of the year: Imran Tahir
 Players' player of the year: AB de Villiers
 Fans' player of the year: AB de Villiers
 Delivery of the year: Dale Steyn
 Women's cricketer of the year: Marizanne Kapp

Domestic
 First-class cricketer of the season: Justin Ontong
 One-day Cup cricketer of the season: Heino Kuhn
 Twenty20 cricketer of the season: David Miller
 Domestic players' player of the season: Kyle Abbott
 Coach of the year: Lance Klusener
 CSA Fair Play award: Dolphins
 SACA MVP: Kyle Abbott
 Groundsman of the year: Wilson Ngobese

2015
The winners were awarded on 3 June 2015.

International
 Cricketer of the year: AB de Villiers
 Test cricketer of the year: Hashim Amla
 ODI cricketer of the year: AB de Villiers
 T20I cricketer of the year: Morne van Wyk
 Players' player of the year: AB de Villiers
 Fans' player of the year: AB de Villiers
 Delivery of the year: Dale Steyn
 International newcomer of the year: Rilee Rossouw
 Women's cricketer of the year: Shabnim Ismail

Domestic
 First-class cricketer of the season: Stephen Cook
 One-day Cup cricketer of the season: Robin Peterson
 Twenty20 cricketer of the season: Kieron Pollard
 Coach of the year: Geoffrey Toyana
 CSA Fair Play award: Titans
 SACA MVP: Dane Paterson
 Umpire of the year: Johan Cloete
 Groundsman of the year: Rudolph du Preez

2016
The winners were awarded on 27 July 2016.

International
 Cricketer of the year: Kagiso Rabada
 Test cricketer of the year: Kagiso Rabada
 ODI cricketer of the year: Kagiso Rabada
 T20I cricketer of the year: Imran Tahir
 Players' player of the year: Kagiso Rabada
 Fans' player of the year: Kagiso Rabada
 Delivery of the year: Kagiso Rabada
 International newcomer of the year: Stephen Cook
 Women's cricketer of the year: Dane van Niekerk

Domestic
 First-class cricketer of the season: Heino Kuhn
 One-day Cup cricketer of the season: Alviro Petersen
 Twenty20 cricketer of the season: Albie Morkel
 Domestic players' player of the season: Heino Kuhn
 Domestic newcomer of the season: Nicky van den Bergh
 Africa T20 Cup player of the year: Lungi Ngidi
 Coach of the year: Rob Walter
 CSA Fair Play award: Cape Cobras
 SACA MVP: Dwaine Pretorius

2017
The winners were awarded on 13 May 2017.

International
 Cricketer of the year: Quinton de Kock
 Test cricketer of the year: Quinton de Kock
 ODI cricketer of the year: Quinton de Kock
 T20I cricketer of the year: Imran Tahir
 Players' player of the year: Quinton de Kock
 Fans' player of the year: Quinton de Kock
 Award of excellence: Temba Bavuma
 Delivery of the year: Kagiso Rabada
 International newcomer of the year: Keshav Maharaj
 Women's cricketer of the year: Sune Luus
 Women's Players' player of the year: Lizelle Lee
 International women's newcomer of the year: Laura Wolvaardt

Domestic
 First-class cricketer of the season: Duanne Olivier
 One-day Cup cricketer of the season: Henry Davids
 Twenty20 cricketer of the season: Farhaan Behardien
 Domestic players' player of the season: Colin Ackermann
 Domestic newcomer of the season: Aiden Markram
 Africa T20 Cup player of the year: Patrick Kruger
 Coach of the year: Mark Boucher
 SACA MVP: Colin Ackermann
 Umpire of the year: Shaun George
 Umpire's umpire of the year: Shaun George

2018
The winners were awarded on 3 June 2018.

International
 Cricketer of the year: Kagiso Rabada
 Test cricketer of the year: Kagiso Rabada
 ODI cricketer of the year: Kagiso Rabada
 T20I cricketer of the year: AB de Villiers
 Players' player of the year: Kagiso Rabada
 Fans' player of the year: Kagiso Rabada
 Delivery of the year: Kagiso Rabada
 International newcomer of the year: Aiden Markram
 Women's cricketer of the year: Dane van Niekerk
 Women's ODI cricketer of the year: Laura Wolvaardt
 Women's T20I cricketer of the year: Chloe Tryon
 Women's Players' player of the year: Laura Wolvaardt

Domestic
 First-class cricketer of the season: Simon Harmer
 One-day Cup cricketer of the season: Tabraiz Shamsi
 Twenty20 cricketer of the season: Tabraiz Shamsi
 Domestic players' player of the season: Pieter Malan
 Domestic newcomer of the season: Kyle Verreynne
 Coach of the year: Mark Boucher
 SACA MVP: JJ Smuts

2019
The winners were awarded on 4 August 2019.

International
 Cricketer of the year: Faf du Plessis
 Test cricketer of the year: Quinton de Kock
 ODI cricketer of the year: Faf du Plessis
 T20I cricketer of the year: David Miller
 International newcomer of the year: Rassie van der Dussen
 Women's cricketer of the year: Dane van Niekerk
 Women's ODI cricketer of the year: Marizanne Kapp
 Women's T20I cricketer of the year: Shabnim Ismail
 International women's newcomer of the year: Tumi Sekhukhune

References

Cricket awards and rankings
South African cricket lists